The 1994 CAF Super Cup was the second CAF Super Cup, an annual football match in Africa organized by the Confederation of African Football (CAF), between the winners of the previous season's two CAF club competitions, the African Cup of Champions Clubs and the African Cup Winners' Cup.

The match took place on 16 January 1994, on neutral stadium at First National Bank Stadium in Johannesburg, South Africa, between Egyptian clubs Zamalek, the 1993 African Cup of Champions Clubs winner, and Al-Ahly, the 1993 African Cup Winners' Cup winner. In the first all-Egyptian CAF Super Cup.
Zamalek won the match 1–0 with the late goal from Ayman Mansour.

Teams

Match details

References

External links
 http://www.angelfire.com/ak/EgyptianSports/ZamalekInAfrSuper.html#1994
 http://www.footballdatabase.eu/football.coupe.zamalek.al-ahly.107289.en.html

1994
Super
1994–95 in Egyptian football
Zamalek SC matches
Al Ahly SC matches